The Houston Bowl was an NCAA-sanctioned Division I-A college football bowl game that was played annually in Houston, Texas, from 2000 to 2005.  For its first two years, the game was known as the galleryfurniture.com Bowl, named for the website of the sponsor, a Houston furniture chain operated by Jim McIngvale, better known as "Mattress Mack". In 2002, the Houston Bowl was born and later named the EV1.net Houston Bowl, after sponsor EV1.net, for the remainder of the game's existence.

History
The bowl played in two locations during its tenure. For the 2000 and 2001 games, Houston's Astrodome was the venue.  In 2002, the game moved to Reliant Stadium, the home of the NFL's Houston Texans.

The bowl initially had tie-ins with the Big 12 Conference and Conference USA. The Big 12 extended their commitment in 2002 and again in 2005. Big 12 teams played in each of the six bowls, compiling a 4–2 record.

After the 2005 game, the bowl failed to return EV1.net as a sponsor. Game management was turned over to the Texans, and the NFL Network changed the game's name to the Texas Bowl. While the 2006 playing of the Texas Bowl maintained continuity of having a Houston-based bowl game, NCAA records treat the Texas Bowl and Houston Bowl as separate games.

Game results

MVPs

Appearances by team

Appearances by conference

References

External links
History of the Houston Bowl

 
Defunct college football bowls